Perils of the Jungle may refer to:

Perils of the Jungle (1915 film), an American film directed by E.A. Martin
Perils of the Jungle (1927 film), an American film directed by Jack Nelson
Perils of the Jungle (1941 film), an American short film directed by Attilio Gatti
Perils of the Jungle (1953 film), an American film directed by George Blair